Sir Raymond Evelyn "Myles" Humphreys  (24 March 1925 – 22 February 1998) was a Northern Irish Ulster Unionist Party politician and activist, and an engineer and businessman.

He served as Lord Mayor of Belfast from 1975 to 1977, and later chaired the Northern Irish Police Authority for a decade. He was knighted in the 1977 Silver Jubilee and Birthday Honours, for public service in Belfast.

Affiliations/positions
 1976: Freeman of the City of London. 
 1946: Northern Ireland Board research engineer 
 1948-1955: Ulster Transport Authority research engineer

Other affiliations/positions
 Belfast Harbour Commissioner
 Senator, Junior Chamber International
 President, Northern Ireland Polio Fellowship
 Chairman, National Housing and Town Planning Council
 High Sheriff of Belfast (1969)
 Senate of Queen's University (1975–77)
 Chairman, Belfast Marathon (1981–85)
 Life member, Railway Preservation Society of Ireland (from 1970 until his death)
 President, City of Belfast Youth Orchestra
 Director, Ulster Orchestra Society (1980–81)
 Northern Ireland Tourist Board (1973–80)
 Chairman, Ulster Tourist Development Association (1968–78)

Education
Humphreys attended Skegoniell Primary School, Londonderry High School and the Belfast Royal Academy.

Death
Sir Myles Humphreys died on 22 February 1998, aged 72, from undisclosed causes.

References

External links
Belfast Telegraph obituary
St Anne's Cathedral (Belfast) website
Theatre NI website

1925 births
1998 deaths
Activists from Northern Ireland
Businesspeople from Northern Ireland
High Sheriffs of Belfast
Knights Bachelor
Lord Mayors of Belfast
People from County Londonderry
Ulster Unionist Party councillors